Gorey (also known as Newborough) was a constituency represented in the Irish House of Commons until its abolition on 1 January 1801.

History
In the Patriot Parliament of 1689 summoned by James II, Gorey was represented with two members.

Members of Parliament, 1620–1801
1634–1635: Sir Adam Loftus and Roger Lorte
1639–1649: Sir Adam Loftus and William Plunkett 
1661–1666: Sir Walter Plunkett and John Kichiugman

1689–1801

Notes

References

Bibliography

Constituencies of the Parliament of Ireland (pre-1801)
Gorey
Historic constituencies in County Wexford
1620 establishments in Ireland
1800 disestablishments in Ireland
Constituencies established in 1620
Constituencies disestablished in 1800